Scopula tsekuensis is a moth of the  family Geometridae. It is found in south-western China.

References

Moths described in 1935
Taxa named by Louis Beethoven Prout
tsekuensis
Moths of Asia